The 2021 leadership election for the National Party of Australia - NSW was held on 6 October 2021 to elect a new leader of the New South Wales Division of the National Party of Australia and subsequently the Deputy Premier of New South Wales, following the resignation of John Barilaro. The election was conducted among the National Party members of the Parliament of New South Wales and contested between Melinda Pavey and Paul Toole. Toole won the election 15 to 3. Bronnie Taylor was elected as deputy party leader, unopposed.

A separate leadership ballot for the National Party's coalition partner, the New South Wales Liberals, was held the day before.

Background
Incumbent leader and deputy premier John Barilaro announced his resignation on 4 October just days after the announcement of Gladys Berejiklian's pending resignation from the leadership of the Liberal Party of Australia (New South Wales Division) and her tenure as Premier of New South Wales. In a press conference, Barilaro said the decision to resign was for the state to have a "new beginning". Barilaro's time as Deputy Premier has seen the Nationals break off from the coalition agreement between themselves and the Liberal Party of Australia briefly while Barilaro himself has previously indicated a desire to contest for the Division of Eden-Monaro in the Parliament of Australia which did not eventuate. Barilaro had served as the deputy premier since 2016, succeeding the previous leader Troy Grant.

Candidates

Declared
Melinda Pavey, Minister for Water, Property and Housing

Paul Toole, Deputy Leader of the New South Wales National Party of Australia and Minister for Regional Transport and Roads

Declined
Adam Marshall, Minister for Agriculture and Western New South Wales

See also

John Barilaro
2023 New South Wales state election
2021 Australian Labor Party (New South Wales Branch) leadership election
2021 Liberal Party of Australia (New South Wales Division) leadership election

References

2021 elections in Australia
National Party of Australia - NSW leadership election